The South Central Correctional Center is a state prison for men located in Licking, Texas County, Missouri, owned and operated by the Missouri Department of Corrections.  The facility houses a maximum of 2500 inmates, and opened in June 2000.

References

Prisons in Missouri
Buildings and structures in Texas County, Missouri
2000 establishments in Missouri